Roana (Cimbrian: Robàan) is a commune in the province of Vicenza, Veneto, Italy. It is west of SP249 road.

The commune consists of six villages or frazioni, spread over a total area of 7,838 hectares: Camporovere, Canove, Cesuna, Mezzaselva, Roana and  Tresché Conca.
It is one of the Sette Comuni Vicentini  where the Cimbrian language was traditionally spoken. In Roana is  the Istituto di Cultura Cimbra, with a museum.

Twin towns
Roana is twinned with:

  Pojana Maggiore, Italy
  Velden, Germany

Sources

External links
Official website

Cities and towns in Veneto